Helladius of Kiev was a monk and saint. His feast day at the Kyiv Caves monastery is on the Saturday after 14 September.

References
Holweck, F. G. A Biographical Dictionary of the Saints. St. Louis, MO: B. Herder Book Co. 1924.

Christian saints in unknown century
Year of birth missing
Year of death missing
Ukrainian saints
Monks of Kyiv Pechersk Lavra